is a 1977 Japanese animated television series produced by Nippon Animation.

Plot 

The first scene opens with a letter of arrival from Sherlock Holmes' niece, Angie Islington, a young 12-year-old noble girl who loves to investigate cases. One day, she stumbles upon a case of robbery which involves the Queen of The United Kingdom's ring that had gone missing during a garden party. Rewarded with a new title of honorary detective and a pendant an emblem of recognition, she embarks on an adventure. She is assisted by Inspector Jackson, a detective of the Scotland Yard, his dashing assistant Michael, and Angie's best friend Franck. They are going to settle numerous problems and bring peace back into the town.

Settings 

Originally planned by Takahara Planning to have a story of a Gypsy girl travelling across Spain looking for her mother, with unbeknown reason transformed into a British detective drama.

Set in the 19th century of London, the whole city has an old rustic vibe, yet still appears to be modern. Landmarks one of such is the Big Ben is present in the story giving an insight of the foreign world of English history.

Inspector Jackson is never fond of Angie as he constantly feel threatened by the fact that the 12-year-old girl is much sharper and intelligent, eventually taking his spotlight away from him. Throughout the whole series, Angie has difficulty in gaining trust on adults whom she just met. That thought of doubt however, vanished as soon as they saw the pendant that the Queen awarded to Angie for claiming her lost ring. The pendant has an inscription behind it written "Protect Charlotte in my name; Victoria Queen of England". Which tells anyone who are brave  enough go against her will have to address to the Queen themselves.

Publications 

The screening of the series was spread throughout Europe and the Arabs. During the 1980s, the release of Sherlock & Me from Portland Films in the UK and The Casebook of Charlotte Holmes in the U.S. Charlotte Holmes is an animation-only version made by Mexican TV, dubbed in Spanish. In America however, it was edited strangely, by using a real-life clip of Sherlock Holmes and his assistant Doctor Watson, indirectly introducing Angie as his niece through a letter.

In 1982, it was broadcast and dubbed in Italy.

Two years after the first release at the UK market, Charlotte made a second display as a "Bonus Cartoon" on Ringo Goes West, a Mountain Video's production. It is an English dub of Toei's Three Musketeers in Boots.

Angie's activities was last seen at France. In 1990 it was aired on French TV, ten years after her debut in most other parts of Europe and thirteen years since she was produced in Japan.

Cast 
Keiko Han as Angie
Hiroko Kikuchi as Poppins
Ichirō Nagai as Jackson
Kaneta Kimotsuki as Benjamin
Kazuyuki Sogabe as Michael
Miyoko Asou as Barbara
Seiko Nakano as Frank
Takeshi Aono as Roger
Tetsuo Mizutori as Alfred
Toku Nishio as Jimmy
Yōko Asagami as Helen
Yūji Fujishiro as Hirari

International titles 
Angie, détective en herbe (French)
Annemarie (Dutch)
Charlotte Holmes
Joō Heika no Petite Ange (Japanese)
Przgody Charlotte Holmes (Polish)
Przygody Charlotte Holmes (Polish)
The Casebook of Charlotte Holmes
Её Высочество малышка Энджи (Russian)
إنجي (Arabic)
المتحرية إنجي (Arabic)
شارلوت (Arabic)
女王陛下のプティアンジェ (Japanese)

Broadcast 
Angie Girl aired on ABC from 13 December 1977 to 27 June 1978.

Some episodes of Angie Girl were released in the United States as part of The Casebook of Charlotte Holmes. The stories were framed by live-action segments featuring actors Michael Evans and Bernard Fox playing the roles of Sherlock Holmes and John Watson.

References

External links 
 Angie Girl at Nippon Animation's English website
 
 
 Angie Girl at UK's website

1977 anime television series debuts
1977 Japanese television series debuts
1978 Japanese television series endings
Anime with original screenplays
Asahi Broadcasting Corporation original programming
Nippon Animation
Mystery anime and manga
Historical anime and manga
Cultural depictions of Queen Victoria on television
Television series set in the 19th century
Television shows set in London